Sternalice  (German: Sternalitz) is a village in the administrative district of Gmina Radłów, within Olesno County, Opole Voivodeship, in south-western Poland.

The village has a population of 838.

References

Sternalice